Scoloplax is the only genus in the catfish (order Siluriformes) family Scoloplacidae, the spiny dwarf catfishes.

Species
The six currently recognized species in this genus are:
 Scoloplax baileyi Rocha, Lazzarotto & Rapp Py-Daniel, 2012
 Scoloplax baskini Rocha, de Oliveira & Rapp Py-Daniel, 2008
 Scoloplax dicra Bailey & Baskin, 1976
 Scoloplax distolothrix Schaefer, Weitzman & Britski, 1989
 Scoloplax dolicholophia Schaefer, Weitzman & Britski, 1989
 Scoloplax empousa Schaefer, Weitzman & Britski, 1989 (Pantanal dwarf catfish)

Distribution
Scoloplax is distributed in South America in Peru, Bolivia, Brazil, and Paraguay. S. baskini is from the small tributaries of Rio Aripuanã, Rio Madeira drainage, Amazonas State, Brazil. S. dicra has the largest distribution in the Amazon basin, originating from the Amazon and Paraguay River basins. S. distolothrix inhabits the Tocantins-Araguaia, Xingu, and Paraguay River basins. S. dolicholophia is known from the Rio Negro basin in Brazil, as well as the Lake Amanã. S. empousa lives in the Amazon and Paraguay-Paraná River basins.

Description
Species of Scoloplax are readily distinguishable from other catfishes by the presence of a conspicuous shield-shaped rostral plate bearing numerous large and recurved odontodes. These fish have three rows of odontode-bearing plates, two bilateral series and one midventral series. There is also a rostral plate with many recurved odootodes. The adipose fin is absent. The greatest length reached is about  SL.

Scoloplax species have modified stomachs that are enlarged, thin-walled, and clear. The esophagus enters the stomach along the dorsal side just posterior to the anterior margin of the stomach; the intestine exits the stomach ventrally. A small patch of muscular tissue represents the digestive portion of the stomach, located from the entrance of the esophagus to where the intestine exits. This modified stomach may be for buoyancy control or for breathing air.

Ecology
Scoloplax species are fairly common among leaf litter in clear and blackwater habitats, including oxbow lakes, backwater pools, and well-vegetated streams.

References

Catfish of South America
Taxa named by Reeve Maclaren Bailey
Taxa named by Jonathan N. Baskin
Fish of the Amazon basin
Fish of Bolivia
Freshwater fish of Brazil
Fish of Paraguay
Fish of Peru
Catfish genera